This is a list of episodes for The Daily Show with Jon Stewart in 2011.

2011

January

February

March

April

May

June

July

August

September

October

November

December

References

 
2011 American television seasons